Witold Roman (born 6 March 1967) is a Polish volleyball player. He competed in the men's tournament at the 1996 Summer Olympics.

References

1967 births
Living people
Polish men's volleyball players
Olympic volleyball players of Poland
Volleyball players at the 1996 Summer Olympics
Volleyball players from Warsaw